The Tennessee Heritage Protection Act (THPA) was enacted in 2013, and amended in 2016 and 2018. It prohibits the removal, relocation, or renaming of a memorial that is, or is located on, public property without permission (a waiver). Permission requires a two-thirds vote of approval from the 29 member board of the Tennessee Historical Commission, 24 of whose members are appointed by the Governor and the remainder ex-officio. The purpose of the Act is to prevent the removal of Confederate memorials from public places in Tennessee. As put by the New York Times, the Act shows "an express intent to prevent municipalities in Tennessee from taking down Confederate memorials."

In 2018, because of Memphis's transfer of ownership of statues of Robert E. Lee and Nathan Bedford Forrest as a means of removing them (see Memphis Greenspace), an amendment to the Act prohibits municipalities from selling or transferring ownership of memorials without permission. The amendment also "allows any entity, group or individual with an interest in a memorial to seek an injunction to preserve the memorial in question."

Under the THPA, as of August, 2020, the Tennessee Historical Commission board has  permitted the removal and relocation of several World War II monuments in Chattanooga, and has approved the sale of several acres of the historic Sam Davis Home in Smyrna for commercial development. Davis was known as the “Boy Hero of the Confederacy.” The Commission has heard a total of four cases, one of which was Memphis's application to remove the Nathan Bedford Forrest statue.

In 2018 The Tennessee Historical Commission acknowledged that one member (Judge David Tipton) also belonged to the Sons of Confederate Veterans. The Memphis Mayor's office has said that as of 2016 there were several people who belonged to both organizations.

References

See also 
 Removal of Confederate monuments and memorials
 Lost Cause of the Confederacy
 Racism in the United States

Tennessee law
2013 establishments in Tennessee
Statutes dealing with Confederate monuments and memorials